Ormiston Bushfield Academy, formerly known as Bushfield Community College, is located in the Orton area of Peterborough.

The college was first opened in 1978. The College was converted to academy status in 2001, and became Ormiston Bushfield Academy. In September 2012 students moved into a £20million, purpose built Academy building. The old Community College buildings were demolished in 2012/2013. An extension to the building was opened in September 2018.

External links
 Ormiston Bushfield Academy
 Ormiston Academies Trust
 BGL Group
 https://www.bbc.co.uk/news/uk-england-cambridgeshire-18785162
 Rugby Success at Twickenham

Academies in Peterborough
Ormiston Academies
Secondary schools in Peterborough
Educational institutions established in 1978
1978 establishments in England
Educational institutions established in 2009
2009 establishments in England